Redneck Wonderland is the tenth studio album by Midnight Oil that was released in July 1998 under the Columbia Records label, which peaked at No.7 on the ARIA Albums Chart. The title of the album was inspired by a wall graffiti, a picture of which can be seen in the promotional Oil Rag Vol. VI issued along with album release.
The album was certified Gold in Australia in 2014. The album's eponymous song was ranked number 93 in Triple M's "Ozzest 100", the 'most Australian' songs of all time. The album marked a shift to an electronic influenced hard rock style.

Track listing

Writing credits sourced from APRA WebWorks search engine, November 2009.

Song notes
 "Concrete" originally performed as "Free My Soul;" known to be played on 20,000 Watt R.S.L. tour.
 "Cemetery in My Mind" known to be played on 20,000 Watt R.S.L. tour.
 "Comfortable Place on the Couch" originally performed as "Haulaway;" known to be played on 20,000 Watt R.S.L. tour.
 "Safety Chain Blues" originally performed as "Warm Babies;" known to be played on 20,000 Watt R.S.L. tour.
 "Blot" known to be played on 20,000 Watt R.S.L. tour. (video of 22 November 1997 performance)
 "White Skin Black Heart" & "What Goes On" both first released on 20,000 Watt R.S.L.; known to be played on 20,000 Watt R.S.L. tour.
 "Return to Sender", "The Great Gibber Plain" and "Drop in the Ocean" were all played on the Redneck Wonderland tour, the latter two having rare appearances in 2017 on The Great Circle Tour and "Drop in the Ocean" being part of the final concert of the final tour in 2022 (which was also the longest Midnight Oil show ever)

The tour
The tour is noted for the use of a wheel featuring the titles of 64 Midnight Oil tracks. Most tracks from Redneck Wonderland were not played after the tour ended; the title track was generally the only song played, often as the opening track to shows on the Capricornia tour. The track was later placed elsewhere in the set list; "Concrete" and "Comfortable Place on the Couch" occasionally reappeared.

Personnel

Midnight Oil
 Peter Garrett - lead vocals
 Bones Hillman - bass, vocals
 Rob Hirst - drums, vocals
 Jim Moginie - guitar, keyboards, synthesiser, vocals
 Martin Rotsey - guitar

Additional musicians
 Jeremy Smith (of H&C) - French horn
 Helen Mountfort - cello
 Hope Csutoros - violin

Charts

Certifications

References

External links
 Midnight Oil

1998 albums
Midnight Oil albums
Columbia Records albums
Sprint Music albums
Albums produced by Warne Livesey